Moira Young (born 1959) is a Canadian children's novelist. Young was born in New Westminster, British Columbia.

Books

Dust Lands trilogy 
 Blood Red Road (2011)
 Rebel Heart (2012)
 Raging Star (2014)

References

External links
 
 

1959 births
Living people
Canadian children's writers
Canadian science fiction writers
Costa Book Award winners
People from New Westminster